Safronov or the feminine equivalent Safronova is a surname. It may refer to:

Places
Safronov, Volgograd Oblast, Volgograd Oblast, Russia
Safronovo, Altai Krai, Russia
Safronovskaya, Arkhangelsk Oblast, Arkhangelsk Oblast, Russia
Safronovskaya, Vologda Oblast, Vologda Oblast, Russia

People with the surname

Safronov
Dmitriy Safronov, Russian athlete (marathon)
Dmitrii Safronov, Russian Paralympic athlete
Ivan Safronov (1956–2007), Russian colonel and journalist
Ivan Safronov (1990) (born 1990), Russian journalist and son of Ivan Safronov (1956–2007)
Kirill Safronov, Russian ice hockey player
Oleksandr Safronov, Ukrainian football player
Viktor Safronov, Soviet astronomer
Vladimir Safronov (1934—1979), Russian boxer

Safronova
Alessya Safronova, Kazakhstani volleyball player
Marianna S. Safronova, Russian/American scientist involved in theoretical atomic physics
Valentina Safronova, Bryansk guerilla in World War II

Safronkov
Vladimir Safronkov, Russian diplomat

See also
Sofronov (disambiguation)

Russian-language surnames